Aya Mansoor  ( born November 11, 1992), is an Iraqi poet, writer, and journalist. She published four books: Fingers' Forest, Alone She Sings, Alice in Baghdad, and Sunny Picture, and a play called Invisible. She also written many articles in different newspapers and magazines such as Al-Jazeera Net, Iraqi Network Magazine, Al-Sabah Iraqi Journalist, and Yalla news website.

Early life 
Born (November 11, 1992) in Baghdad, she graduated from Teachers' Institute in 2012 with a degree in mathematics. She started publishing her writings on social media websites in 2009. In 2014 Al-Arabiya published her first book, collecting all her poems.

Career in journalism and media 
She worked in Iraqi Network Magazine/Al-Iraqiya channel since 2016, she wrote many weekly bits including:
 Investigation of the Week: a weekly article that is published on the sixth page of every issue of Iraqi Network Magazine
 A series of reports about the libraries of Iraq: A weekly paragraph that is published on the 34th page of the same magazine
 Fingerprint: A series of articles about famous Iraqi people that have achievements, published in the website of Iraqi Network Magazine.
 Producing and presenting short videos on Yalla news website
 A bit "Make Your Life Right" presented from 2017 to 2018

Journalism 
 Al-Sabah Al-Iraqiya: "Female Ink": A weekly column (2016–2017)
 Al-Alam Al-Jadeed Iraqi Newspaper: Varied articles and columns (2015)
 Al-Alam Iraqi Newspaper: Varied articles and columns (2019)
 Al-Magharib Lebanese Website: Editor (2015–2016)
 Kutub Egyptian Website: Editor of cultural articles (2015–2016)
 Shabab Al-Safeer Website

Publications 
 Fingers' Forest: A poetry collection published by Al-Arabiya for Sciences, 2014 
 Alone She Sings: Poetry collection published by Sutoor for Publishing and Distribution, 2017, it was translated to French and published by Editions des Lisières as "Seule elle chante"
 Alice in Baghdad: An entertaining, educational story about Baghdad areas published by Farashat For Kids, 2017
 Sunny Picture: Collected stories published by Sutoor for publishing and distribution, 2019 
 Invisible (Play): A theatrical play about Iraqi women (As part of Darboona project about the challenges Iraqi women face in this community), it was performed in the Academy of Arts in Berlin, Germany, 2016

Lectures, seminars and poetry evenings

Poetry evenings and seminars 
 Baghdad, 2013–2017
 Lebanon, 2016
 Egypt, 2017
 Oman, 2017
 France, 2019

Seminars about writing and poetry 
 American University in Suleimania, 2014
 University of Lyon, France, 2019
 University of Nice, France, 2019

Theatrical plays 
 With actress Judy Morris and singer Leo Ebirto, in the national theatre of Besançon, France

Lectures about writing 
 Istanbul Shaheer University, Turkey, 2019

Awards and certificates 
 Iraqi National Journalism Syndicate Award 2019
 Certificate from the Carnival of World Peace Day by Peace Makers, Iraq, 2014
 Distinguish and Creativity shield from Baghdad International Expo, 2019
 Creativity award by Ahlamy event by Volunteers for Iraq Organization, 2015
 Shield of Success, awarded for talking at "I talk", by the leading youth forum in Istanbul, 2019

References

External links 
 

1992 births
21st-century Iraqi poets
Iraqi journalists
Iraqi women poets
Iraqi writers
Living people